Jennifer Lartey is a Ghanaian lawyer and diplomat. She is Ghana's first Ambassador Plenipotentiary and Extraordinary to the Kingdom of Norway.

Early life and education 

Jennifer Lartey is a graduate of the prestigious University of Ghana. Prior to her tertiary education, she attended Mfanstiman Girls Secondary School where she completed her senior high school education. She also holds a Master’s Degree in Business Administration (MBA) from the University of Ghana and an LLB from the University of London.

Ambassadorial appointment 
In February 2019, President Nana Akuffo-Addo named Jennifer Lartey as Ghana's first Ambassador to Norway. She was one of two distinguished Ghanaians who were named to head different diplomatic Ghanaian mission in the world.

Personal life 
Jennifer Lartey is married to Steve Lartey, a Ghanaian businessman who was previously an executive at one of Ghana's first financial firms. Together, they have three children. She also has a grandson.

References 

Living people
Year of birth missing (living people)
Ghanaian women ambassadors
University of Ghana alumni
Alumni of the University of London
Mfantsiman Girls' Secondary School alumni
Ambassadors of Ghana to Norway